The Autonomic Network Architecture (ANA) project aims at exploring novel ways of organizing and using networks beyond legacy Internet technology. The ultimate goal is to design and develop a novel autonomic networking architecture that enables flexible, dynamic, and fully autonomous formation of network nodes as well as whole networks. Universities and research institutes from Europe and Northern America are participating in this project.

The resulting autonomic network architecture will allow dynamic adaptation and re-organisation of the network according to the working, economical and social needs of the users. This is expected to be especially challenging in a mobile context where new resources become available dynamically, administrative domains change frequently, and the economic models may vary.

About the Project 
This Integrated Project aims at exploring novel ways of organizing and using networks beyond legacy Internet technology. The ultimate goal is to design and develop a novel network architecture that enables flexible, dynamic, and fully autonomic formation of network nodes as well as whole networks. It will allow dynamic adaptation and re-organization of the network according to the working, economical and social needs of the users. This is expected to be especially challenging in a mobile context where new resources become available dynamically, administrative domains change frequently, and the economic models may vary.

The scientific objective of this proposal is to identify fundamental autonomic network principles. Moreover, this project will build, demonstrate, and test such an autonomic network architecture. The key attribute is that such a network scales in a functional way that is, the network can extend both horizontally (more functionality) as well as vertically (different ways of integrating abundant functionality). The challenge addressed in this project is to come up with a network architecture and to fill it with the functionality needed to demonstrate the feasibility of autonomic networking within the coming 4 years.

Facts and Figures 
 Period: January 1, 2006–December 31, 2009
 Funding Agency: European Union (EU)
 Program: Information Societies Technology—Future Emerging Technologies (IST-FET)
 Coordinating Agency: ETH Zurich, Communication Systems Group

Project Objectives 
The Autonomic Network Architecture (ANA) project has two complementary objectives that iteratively provide feedback to each other: a scientific objective and a technological one.

Scientific Objective 
To identify fundamental autonomic networking principles that enable networks to scale not only in size but also in functionality. The main premise of our work is that a functionally scaling network is a synonym for an evolving network which includes the various self-x attributes essential to autonomic communication such as self-management, self-optimization, self-monitoring, self-repair, and self-protection. The hypothesis is that, due to these self-x attributes, such functional scaling will naturally lead to networks that are not only richer in functionality but which also scale in size. Scientific research in ANA will explore the “Internet de-construction” trends of functional atomization, diffusion and sedimentation that will replace the current static layering approach.

A new Autonomic Network Architecture will emerge as a result of this research. This architecture will provide the framework for network function re-composition. The goal is to produce an architectural design that enables flexible, dynamic and fully autonomic formation of large-scale networks in which the functionalities of each constituent network node are also composed in an autonomic fashion. This architecture must allow dynamic adaptation and re-organisation of the network according to the working, economical and social needs of the users. Moreover, it must support mobile nodes and multiple administrative domains.

Technological Objective 
The second premise in ANA is that the only way to make new ideas and concepts succeed is to put them into practice. Therefore, ANA takes on the challenge of not only producing original scientific research results and a novel architectural design, but also showing that they work in real situations, and using the experience gained experimentally as feedback to refine the architectural models and other research results.

The technological objective of ANA is therefore to build an experimental autonomic network architecture, and to demonstrate the feasibility of autonomic networking within the coming 4 years.

As a first step, a network based on the predominant infrastructure of Ethernet switches and wireless access points will be built. The goal is to demonstrate self-organization of individual nodes into a network. The design of such network should potentially scale to large network meshes in the range of 105 active (routing) elements. Obviously, the consortium alone will not have resources to literally build a network of 105 nodes. In order to show scalability, three approaches are envisaged: a) overlay for interconnecting the participating sites, b) simulations, and c) a distributed open collaborative approach similar to successful initiatives such as “SETI@Home”, “Folding@Home”, to include external experimentators and to disseminate ANA results.

The second step, using insights from the first effort, will loosen the constraints and permit wired and multihop wireless heterogeneous devices to be integrated in an autonomic way. Here the focus is on the self-organization of networks into a global network. The rationale for a two phase approach is that an architecture can only be developed and its quality be validated if more than one case is explored.

These two (scientific and technical) objectives complement and reinforce each other in a tight feedback loop: Prototypes of research results will be implemented in the testbed at an early stage, such that preliminary experimental results can be used as a feedback to steer and refine the architectural design and to obtain more accurate and realistic research results. The research part will shape the testbed in order to maintain it at the fore-front of technology. To help the long term visions to materialize, ANA uses the testbed as an investigative research vehicle while remaining committed to the far looking character of the situated and autonomic networking initiative.

Project Partners 
 ETH Zurich, Communication Systems Group
 University of Basel
 NEC Europe Ltd. Network Laboratories (NEC)
 Lancaster University (ULanc)
 Fraunhofer Institute for Open Communication Systems (FOKUS)
 Université de Liége (ULg)
 Université Paris VI
 Pierre et Marie Curie (UPMC)
 National and Kapodistrian University of Athens (NKUA)
 University of Oslo (UiO)
 Telekom Austria
 University of Waterloo

See also 
 Autonomic Computing
 Autonomic Systems
 Network Compartment
 Autonomic Networking

External links 
 EU IST Project
 ANA Project website (Broken link, please remove)
 Practical Autonomic Computing - Roadmap to Self Managing Technology 
Computer networks